Paphiopedilum canhii is an Asian species of slipper orchid and the type species of the subgenus Paphiopedilum subg. Megastaminodium. It is named after Mr. Canh Chu Xuan, the Service Officer who received the plants in November 2009 from the H'Mong (Meo) people.   The plants were brought into his office of "Civilian Governmental Service for Care of Natural Resources and Connections with Local Minorities" for further study and description, after several months in the nursery the plant flowered in April 2010. Its unusual characteristics had been recorded a year before in local markets by orchid growers in Dien Bien and Son La cities.

Description

Distribution 

Paphiopedilum canhii is endemic to Vietnam and is known only from one locality along the border with Laos PDR in Dien Bien Phu province. It grows between 600m and 800m asl

Habitat

Conservation status 

Paphiopedilum canhii is critically endangered in the wild, mainly due to poaching and habitat destruction. The region where the species occurs is a distinct and significant center of Paphiopedilum speciation and diversity.  As a result, the area has been a priority not only for botanical exploration but also for ruthless collection for horticultural purposes. 

In 2015, the range for this species was estimated at 4 km2 with less than 10 mature individuals remaining in the wild.

References

External links 

canhii
Orchids of Vietnam
Orchids of Laos